Alexander Martin George Henderson (born 3 November 2001) is an English footballer who plays college soccer for Georgia State University.

College career 
Ahead of the 2020 NCAA Division I men's soccer season, Henderson signed a National Letter of Intent to play college soccer for Georgia State University. He made his college soccer debut on 18 September 2020, playing 90 minutes in a 2–1 victory over Mercer University, contributing to one assist. Henderson was named to the TopDrawer Soccer Team of the Week for September 22. Henderson scored his first collegiate goal on 13 November 2020 in a 1-1 draw against Central Arkansas.

Following the conclusion of the 2020 season, Henderson was named a freshman (first year) All-American by TopDrawer Soccer, for being one of the top first year college soccer players in the United States.

Club career

Ipswich Town
Henderson made his first-team debut for the club on 4 December 2019, starting in a 1–1 away draw with Peterborough United in an EFL Trophy second round match, which Ipswich went on to win 5–6 on penalties. He was offered a one-year extension to his scholarship at the end of the 2019–20 season, however he turned the deal down in order to take up an offer for a place at Georgia State University in the United States.

Career statistics

References

External links

Alex Henderson at Georgia State University Athletics

2001 births
Living people
Association football defenders
English footballers
Bury Town F.C. players
Georgia State Panthers men's soccer players
Ipswich Town F.C. players
Isthmian League players
English expatriate sportspeople in the United States
Expatriate soccer players in the United States